Croatia was represented at the Eurovision Song Contest 1997 by E.N.I. with the song "Probudi me". The quartet were the winners of Dora 1997, which selected the fifth Croatian entry for the contest.

Background

Croatia first entered the Eurovision Song Contest in 1993, having previously competed as a part of Yugoslavia from 1961 to 1991. SR Croatia was the most successful republic of Yugoslavia at Eurovision, with 11 of the 27 entries that won the Yugoslavian selection for the Eurovision Song Contest being Croatian.

Croatia produced over 11 entries in total for Yugoslavia, giving some of the country's best placings in the Contest. Croatia gave Yugoslavia three of the country's Top 5 placings in the contest, with Riva winning the 1989 Contest with "Rock Me", as well as fourth-place finishes for both Daniel and Novi fosili.

1997 marked Croatia's fifth appearance at the contest as an independent nation. Previous results for the independent Croatia were mixed, with their first two entries gaining 15th and 16th position. However Croatia's entries from 1995 and 1996 both placed within the top 10, with Magazin and Lidija and Maja Blagdan placing 6th and 4th respectively.

Before Eurovision

Dora 1997 
Hrvatska radiotelevizija (HRT), the Croatian broadcaster, held a national final to select the Croatian entry for Eurovision 1997, held in Dublin, Ireland. Dora 1997 was held at the Crystal Ballroom of Hotel Kvarner in Opatija on 9 March, hosted by Ljudevit Grgurić Grga. 20 entries competed, and the winner was decided by 20 regional juries.

At Eurovision 
Heading into the final of the contest, RTÉ reported that bookmakers ranked the entry 6th out of the 25 entries. E.N.I. performed 23rd on the night of the contest, following France and preceding the United Kingdom. The group received 24 points, placing 17th of the 25 competing countries.

Voting

References

External links 
Croatian National Final 1997
 Hrvatsko natjecanje za pjesmu Eurovizije Dora '97 HRT

1997
Countries in the Eurovision Song Contest 1997
Eurovision